Ogugua Okonkwo popularly known as Og Okonkwo is a Nigerian womenswear designer, fashionista, and the founder and creative director of the fashion brand Style Temple.

Biography 
Okonkwo was raised in Enugu, Nigeria, and she studied laboratory science at the University of Nigeria, Nsukka before delving into fashion design. Okonkwolaunched Style Temple in 2012, after long stints training as a fashion assistant and junior designer at a few Abuja-based fashion labels.

Fashion 
Style Temple, under Okonkwo's leadership, showcases their collection annually at the Lagos Fashion and Design Week, and the brand has been hailed by Vogue , Fashion Bomb Daily, Elle, Glamour, and CNN for its visionary take on womenswear.

Awards and nominations 
 The Future Awards Africa Prize for Fashion, 2016.
 Ebony Live Sisterhood Award Prize for Fashion, 2017.

References

Nigerian women fashion designers
African fashion designers
University of Nigeria alumni
Living people
People from Enugu
Year of birth missing (living people)